Cephalodina is a genus of longhorn beetles of the subfamily Lamiinae, containing the following species:

 Cephalodina acangassu Martins & Galileo, 1993
 Cephalodina capito (Bates, 1866)
 Cephalodina crassiceps Bates, 1881

References

Hemilophini